Arnia is a genus of moths of the family Crambidae. It contains only one species, Arnia nervosalis, which is found in France, Spain, Portugal and on Corsica, Sardinia and Sicily, as well as in North Africa, including Algeria and Morocco.

References

Moths described in 1849
Spilomelinae
Moths of Europe
Moths of Africa
Taxa named by Achille Guenée